Wolfskehl may refer to:

Karl Wolfskehl (1869 -1948), a Jewish-German author
Paul Wolfskehl (1856-1906), a German mathematician